Saint-Valentin is a municipality in southern Quebec, Canada located in the administrative area of the Montérégie. The population as of the Canada 2011 Census was 470.

Named after the Christian hallow Saint Valentine, the community has lately been trying to capitalize on its name as a destination for lovers. A Festival de la Saint-Valentin is held every February, along with a St. Valentine's Day Mass. The post office frequently receives letters from around the world to postmark.

Demographics

Population

Language

Education

The South Shore Protestant Regional School Board previously served the municipality.

See also
List of municipalities in Quebec

References

Incorporated places in Le Haut-Richelieu Regional County Municipality
Municipalities in Quebec